Cordulegastroidea is a superfamily of dragonflies that contains three families.

Families
The superfamily includes the following three families:

 Cordulegastridae
 Neopetaliidae
 Chlorogomphidae

See also

 Odonata
 Aeshnoidea
 Libelluloidea

 
Dragonflies
Insect superfamilies